The 1914 U.S. Open was the 20th U.S. Open, held August 20–21 at Midlothian Country Club in Midlothian, Illinois, a suburb southwest of Chicago. 21-year-old Walter Hagen held off amateur Chick Evans by a single stroke to win the first of his two U.S. Open titles. It was the first of Hagen's eleven major championships.

Hagen opened with a U.S. Open record 68, a stroke ahead of defending champion Francis Ouimet. He led Tom McNamara by a shot after 36 holes, then took a two-stroke lead over McNamara into the final round, with Ouimet three back. McNamara and Ouimet, however, fell back with rounds of 83 and 78, respectively. That left the hard-charging Evans as the last player capable of catching Hagen. Evans needed a two on the 18th to tie, but his chip from the edge of the green came up just short. Hagen birdied the 18th for the fourth consecutive round, a feat unmatched by any U.S. Open champion before or since, and prevailed by one over Evans. Evans' 141 over the final 36 holes set a new U.S. Open record, but it was broken just two years later.

Two-time champion John McDermott, age 22, tied for ninth in his sixth and final U.S. Open appearance.

Past champions in the field 

Source:

Did not play: Alex Smith (1906, 1910), Laurie Auchterlonie (1902), Harry Vardon (1900), Willie Smith (1899).

Round summaries

First round
Thursday, August 20, 1914 (morning)

Source:

Second round
Thursday, August 20, 1914 (afternoon)

Source:

Third round
Friday, August 21, 1914 (morning)

Source:

Final round
Friday, August 21, 1914 (afternoon)

Source:
(a) denotes amateur

References

External links
USGA Championship Database
USOpen.com - 1914

U.S. Open (golf)
Golf in Illinois
U.S. Open
U.S. Open (golf)
U.S. Open
August 1914 sports events